Taryn Manning is an American actress and singer. She is best known for portraying Tiffany "Pennsatucky" Doggett in the Netflix original series Orange Is the New Black (2013–2019), Cherry in Sons of Anarchy (2008–2010), Nola in Hustle & Flow (2005) and Janeane in 8 Mile (2002).

Early life
Taryn Manning was born in Falls Church, Virginia, the daughter of Bill Manning, a musician, and his wife, Sharyn Louise (née White). Manning's parents divorced when she was two months old. She and her brother Kellin were raised by their mother in Tucson, Arizona. Manning grew up living in a trailer park with her brother and single mother, who supported the family on a strict income: "My mom didn't buy herself a new pair of shoes and a new outfit until I moved out ... Literally when I asked my mom for a dollar I got one single dollar." In spite of the family's financial troubles, her mother was able to enroll Manning in karate, dance, and acting classes. When Manning was 12, her family relocated to Encinitas, California. Two years later, her father died by suicide.

Acting career

1999–2005: Beginnings
Manning began acting in the late 1990s, appearing in small roles in several film and television productions, including episodes of The Practice, Get Real, Speedway Junky, NYPD Blue and Popular. She also made a guest-appearance on the TV series Boston Public, in a role that was specifically written for her. In 1999, she was featured in an independent film called Speedway Junky. She also auditioned for the American version of Popstars, which aired in early 2001 on The WB.

She made her film debut with a part in the romantic drama Crazy/Beautiful, which was followed by a role in the 2002 feature film Crossroads, where she played one of two best friends of singer Britney Spears. She had minor roles in 8 Mile as B-Rabbit's ex-girlfriend, Janeane, and in Peter Kosminsky's White Oleander. Along with supporting roles in the films Lucky 13 and Debating Robert Lee, Manning appeared briefly in Anthony Minghella's Civil War melodrama Cold Mountain (2003) and in the romantic comedy A Lot Like Love (2005).

2005–present: Independent films and breakthrough

Her breakthrough role was as Nola, a prostitute in Memphis, Tennessee, in the 2005 film Hustle & Flow. Director Craig Brewer saw Manning's picture in a photography book and was convinced that the actress who played Nola should look just like her. Subsequent film roles include Unbeatable Harold, When the Nines Roll Over., and, later, Weirdsville, which co-starred Scott Speedman and Wes Bentley. Boomkat's song "It's Not My Fault" appeared on the soundtrack for the film as a duet by Manning and John Rowley. In 2007, she played Ivy Chitty on the short-lived Fox television series Drive. In After Sex Manning played the supporting role of Alanna. She had leading roles in horror films Cult and Banshee; in the latter, she performed her own stunts. "I got hurt one day during one of the chase scenes, where another car crashed into my car," Manning explained of her stunts. Manning appeared in the romantic comedy Jack and Jill vs. the World. She played Rita Cherry on four episodes of Sons of Anarchy. In 2008 she appeared in Butch Walker's music video for "The Weight Of Her" and in will.i.am's collage-style music video, "Yes We Can". She co-starred with Bill Pullman in the surreal drama film Your Name Here, in which she played Nikki, who is based on Victoria Principal. The film is based loosely on sci-fi writer Philip K. Dick's life.

In 2009, she appeared in The Perfect Age of Rock 'n' Roll. The film received mostly favorable reviews from critics and fans. Manning joined forces with Ron Perlman in two 2009 films, The Devil's Tomb and The Job. She also appeared in the horror film Kill Theory. The Job premiered at the San Diego Film Festival on September 25, 2009. Critics called the film "entertaining and fun with twists that arrive like clockwork". In 2009, Taryn portrayed Caroline Bishop in Five Good Years. In February 2010, she was cast in the reboot of Hawaii Five-0 as the younger sister of main character Steve McGarrett.

In early 2012, Taryn signed on to star in the supernatural web series The Unknown, which premiered on Crackle on July 13, 2012. In 2013, she began playing Tiffany "Pennsatucky" Doggett in the original Netflix series Orange Is the New Black. In 2015 she portrayed Michelle Knight in the Lifetime film Cleveland Abduction based on the real-life events surrounding Ariel Castro's kidnappings.

Manning was a part of Season 16 of the celebrity version of Worst Cooks in America. She quit the season in the second episode after refusing to eat a chicken foot. In 2020, Taryn signed on to Coke Daniel's upcoming suspense thriller Karen. She played the role of Karen Drexler, a literal Karen (slang) who is obsessed with her black neighbors.

Music career

2001–2011: Pop music beginnings and Boomkat

In 2001, Manning auditioned for the musical reality television show Popstars USA on the WB. In 2003, Manning and her brother Kellin formed the band Boomkat. The band first signed a major label deal with American Idol producer Randy Jackson, but the deal fell through. Robbie Robertson then signed them to DreamWorks Records, which was Boomkat's label from 2002 to 2004. In 2002, she sang a rendition of "I'll Take You There" with Tweet in several Gap commercials directed by Peter Lindbergh. Their debut album, Boomkatalog.One, was released on March 18, 2003. Boomkat released two singles "The Wreckoning" and "What U Do 2 Me". The first single, "The Wreckoning", hit No. 1 on the Hot Dance Music/Club Play chart. The band closed out 2003 as the No. 5 Hot Dance Club Play Artist for the year in Billboard Magazine. Music from Boomkatalog.One has also appeared in movies, including Mean Girls, Crossroads, The Hot Chick, 8 Mile and The Italian Job.

After a hiatus, in an interview in October 2005's issue of Nylon magazine, Manning mentioned that she is writing songs for the new album once they find another record label. In 2007, the act was dropped by their label Dreamworks. Boomkat released their first single in four years, called "Runaway" on April 8, 2008. In early June 2008 Boomkat's second album A Million Trillion Stars became available in online stores.

In October 2008, Boomkat played several shows throughout the Los Angeles area, hitting spots like North Hollywood's NOHO Scene Festival and venues such as the Viper Room and Hotel Cafe. In December 2008 Manning recorded a version of Tom Petty's "Christmas All Over Again", which premiered on her official Myspace page. On March 3, 2009, their official first single, "Run Boy" was released along with a visually electric music video. The single premiered on People.com. A Million Trillion Stars was officially released on March 10 by independent record label, Little Vanilla Records. In 2009, Manning was featured on indie band Dreamers' song "Lonely World", as well as in their new music video called "The Dreamers". In the music video, she takes on the role of Ring Master. On October 28, she announced that Boomkat is working on their third studio album. The band's fifth music video from A Million Trillion Stars premiered on MySpace on Wednesday, February 17, 2010.

2009–present: Solo career
In September 2009, Manning stated that she is working on a solo album. She sang her first solo single, "So Talented" in an episode of Melrose Place. The song was written with the producer Linney (Darkchild Entertainment). After the song "Spotlight" was featured in an episode of Hawaii Five-0, it was released via iTunes & Amazon MP3. "Turn It Up" was released as the first official single in 2011. The music video premiered on People.com on May 4, 2011. "Turn It Up" peaked at No. 21 on Billboard (magazine)'''s Dance Club Songs Chart for the week of October 22, 2011. Manning's single "Send Me Your Love" was released digitally on August 21, 2012. The song was the first official single from her solo album entitled Freedom City, which was released in September. It topped the Dance Club Songs chart. Manning followed "Send Me Your Love" with "Summer Ashes", a collaboration with KDrew released on July 23, 2013. Her single with Bynon 'All The Way' was released January 12, 2015. On May 5, 2017, Manning released her solo single "Gltchlfe". The single peaked at number 1 on Billboard's Dance Club Songs Chart on August 10, 2017, becoming her second number 1 on the chart, following "Send Me Your Love" in 2012. In 2019, she released the single "The Light" as well as three remixes. The singles "Bring Me Back To You" and "Chains" were also released in 2019. On August 14, 2020, she released the single "Time Wasted" for digital streaming.

Other ventures
Boomkat's independent label, Little Vanilla Records is owned by Manning. From 2005 to 2009 Manning co-owned a clothing line called Born Uniqorn with best friend Tara Jane. She has appeared in advertising campaigns for Juicy Couture and Frankie B. Her campaign with Frankie B included a short film, called "Let's Get Lost", which is the original song featured in the video by musician Gilby Clarke with vocals by Manning. She has appeared on the cover of several magazines, including Nylon, Stuff, FHM, Dazed & Confused, 944, Music Fashion, Miami Living and Paw Print. Manning posed nude for Playboy in the April 2011 issue of the magazine.

Personal life
As of 2020, Manning resides in Palm Springs, California. In 2017, Manning stated she prefers men and does not identify as gay despite her history of dating women.

Manning was aboard JetBlue Flight 292 when it made an emergency landing at Los Angeles International Airport on September 21, 2005, after the nose gear jammed in an abnormal position. No one was injured. She stated that "it was the most surreal, out-of-body experience I ever had."

Legal and personal issues
On October 12, 2012, Manning was arrested for assaulting her personal assistant and makeup artist, Holli Hartman. Hartman, who resided in Manning's apartment at the time, declined to prosecute. Manning's lawyer cited Hartman as saying that she and Manning loved each other and wanted the ordeal to be over. In November 2012, Manning accepted a plea bargain of one day of community service and good behavior for the next six months, after which the case would be closed.

In November 2014, Manning was arrested for violating a restraining order and making criminal threats against girlfriend, Jeanine Heller. In 2015, Manning accused Heller of harassment. Heller was sentenced to four months in jail for violating the conditions of her plea bargain. Prior to their relationship souring, Heller and Manning lived together at Heller's New York residence. In 2016, it was found that Manning had fabricated contact violations, and as a result Heller had been falsely arrested and imprisoned via forced plea deal. As of 2020 Heller has not taken legal action against Manning or the Manhattan DA.

In 2016, Manning was again accused of attacking girlfriend Hollianne Hartman. Hartman sought a domestic restraining order against Manning but was denied due to jurisdictional issues. The attack was one of several that Hartman claimed to have suffered, with the most recent alleged abuse occurring in late 2015 at Manning's Manhattan apartment. Manning's lawyer stated that the application for a restraining order was preceded by stalking and theft charges filed against Hartman and was intended as a distraction from those charges.

In 2016, Manning filed a lawsuit against the state of New York claiming she was falsely arrested in 2014. A Manhattan Judge dismissed the case stating Manning's claims “lacked merit” and no such violation occurred. It was further revealed Manning had fabricated allegations of stalking and subsequent claims of contact violations against her former roommate and girlfriend.

In 2019, Manning claimed she was "epically hack[ed]" and the victim of "cyber-criminals" and "cyberbullying" after making several disturbing Instagram posts that included disparaging remarks about the cast of Orange is the New Black.

 Substance abuse issues 
Manning has alcohol abuse disorder. In 2016, Orange is the New Black'' producers threatened to remove Manning from the show and required her to enter a drug rehabilitation facility for treatment after her alcohol abuse began to interfere with production of the series. Manning, defying production orders, refused treatment and left rehab after one day.

Filmography

Film

Television

Music videos

Discography

Singles

Other recordings

Awards and nominations

References

External links

 
 

Living people
20th-century American actresses
21st-century American actresses
21st-century American women singers
21st-century American singers
Actresses from Tucson, Arizona
American dance musicians
American fashion designers
American female models
American women singer-songwriters
American film actresses
American women pop singers
American women rock singers
American rock songwriters
American television actresses
American television personalities
American people convicted of drug offenses
Orange County School of the Arts alumni
Singer-songwriters from Virginia
American women in electronic music
American women television personalities
American women fashion designers
LGBT actresses
American LGBT singers
Singer-songwriters from Arizona
Survivors of aviation accidents or incidents
Year of birth missing (living people)